Any Old Time is a 1986 studio album by Carmen McRae, featuring the tenor saxophonist Clifford Jordan. McRae was nominated for the Grammy Award for Best Jazz Vocal Performance, Female at the 30th Annual Grammy Awards for her performance on this album.

Reception

Reviewing the album for AllMusic, Scott Yanow wrote that "McRae is heard in prime form performing a variety of top standards...Although recorded in the studio, this excellent outing gives listeners a good idea of how Carmen McRae sounded live. Well worth searching for".

Track listing
 "Tulip or Turnip" (Duke Ellington, Don George) – 4:37
 "Old Devil Moon" (E.Y. "Yip" Harburg, Burton Lane) – 4:20 
 "Have You Met Miss Jones?" (Lorenz Hart, Richard Rodgers) – 5:21 
 "Love Me Tender" (Vera Matson, Elvis Presley) – 5:57
 "I Hear Music" (Burton Lane, Frank Loesser) – 4:49 
 "This is Always" (Mack Gordon, Harry Warren) – 5:05
 "Body and Soul" (Frank Eyton, Johnny Green, Edward Heyman, Robert Sour) – 6:31
 "Prelude to a Kiss" (Ellington, Irving Gordon, Irving Mills) – 5:25
 "Mean to Me" (Fred E. Ahlert, Roy Turk) – 4:23 
 "Any Old Time" (Artie Shaw) – 3:02 
 "It Could Happen to You" (Johnny Burke, Jimmy Van Heusen) – 2:23
 "I'm Glad There Is You" (Jimmy Dorsey, Paul Mertz) – 3:52 
 "Billie's Blues" (Billie Holiday) – 5:14

Personnel
Carmen McRae – vocals, piano
Clifford Jordan – tenor saxophone
John Collins – guitar
Eric Gunnison – piano
Scott Colley – double bass
Mark Pulice – drums
Performance
Haruo Koguchi – art direction
Joe Martin, Ed Rak – engineer
Sonny Lester – executive producer
Hiraku Aoki – liner notes
Hiroshi Gotoh – mixing
Shigeru Uchiyama – photography
Tom Ueno – producer

References

1986 albums
Carmen McRae albums
Denon Records albums